Baaghi is a 2000 Indian action drama film starring Sanjay Dutt, Manisha Koirala and Aditya Pancholi. The film is directed by Rajesh Kumar Singh and was released on 7 April 2000.

Plot
Raja is in love with a nightclub dancer, Rani. Rani gets Raja a job as a security guard in a Hotel run by Vikram. Raja's life turns haywire when Manubhai falls for Rani and tries to get her at any cost. Rani instead of falling prey to his lusty charms prefers to kill herself. Raja then turns into a professional killer in Vikram's gang. Raja comes across Soorya (master Rohan) who idolizes him as his hero and even adopts his lifestyle. Soorya grows up and falls in love with Vikram's sister Kiran. Initially Raja encourages Soorya, but when he learns that the girl is Kiran, he advises Soorya to relent, but in vain. Raja also tries to pacify Vikram, but in vain. Raja becomes a rebel with a cause, mainly to protect love. Raja tries to get Soorya and Kiran marriage but just after becoming husband wife, Raja and Vikram kill each other. The movie ends with everybody crying for Raja and Vikram.

Cast

Sanjay Dutt as Raja
Manisha Koirala as Rani
Aditya Pancholi as Vikram 
Inder Kumar as Surya (Suryaprakash Vidyashankar Pandey)
Tina Sen as Kiran (Vikram's sister Pinky)
Shalini Kapoor Sagar as Vikram's wife
Mohan Joshi as Assistant Commissioner of Police
Gulshan Grover as Manmohan
Shivaji Satam as Prof. Vidyashankar Pandey (Surya's father)
Shama Deshpande as Surya's Mother
Sanjay Narvekar as Chakku
Mahesh Anand as Chhottey
Tej Sapru as Randhir Kanojia
Jack Gaud as Gogi Pathan
Gavin Packard as Zandu Pathan
Ankush Mohit
Uday Tikekar
Rana Jung Bahadur as Peter
Dinesh Hingoo as Manuz, the drunkard
Deepak Jethi

Soundtrack 
Music: Sajid-Wajid | Lyrics: Faaiz Anwar

Track list

Reception
A review in Sify, gave the film a three star rating, writing "BAAGHI, directed by Rajesh Kumar Singh suffers from an identity crisis. Is it a gangster film, is it a love story, is it about a possessive brother, or is it about lost innocence? And then should it not be Vaastav, Tezaab or Lawaaris? In the end it is all and with so many elements thrown in it flattens under its own pressure." Faisal Shariff of Rediff.com was critical of Tina Sen and Inder Kumar's acting.

References

External links 
 

2000 films
2000s Hindi-language films